Benrishi (弁理士) is a Japanese legal profession specifically licensed to practice intellectual property law. Most benrishi specialize in patent law, but are also allowed to practice in copyright, trademark, unfair competition and trade secret law.

While benrishi are often referred to as "patent attorneys" in English, their qualifications differ from patent attorneys in the United States and Germany in some aspects. Benrishi are not necessarily required to possess legal educations. Benrishi also have greater authority than patent specialists in other countries, as they are allowed to represent clients in administrative proceedings and out-of-court bargaining related to IP rights.

The benrishi examination (弁理士試験 benrishi-shiken) covers a broad range of intellectual property law (patent, utility model, design, trademark, treaties, copyright and unfair competition law) and limited fields of law and science. The benrishi examination consisted of three stages. The first stage is the multiple choice exam, the second stage is the essay exam, and the final stage is the oral exam.

, 9,300 benrishi are practicing in Japan, approximately as many per capita as in the United States. Entrance to the profession is regulated by a low pass rate (about 7% as of 2008; it was less than 3% until about 1997) on the benrishi examination only. The Japan Patent Office and government officials have expressed an interest in attracting more individuals to the profession as part of a broader series of reforms in Japan's legal professions.

Different from a U.S. patent agent, a benrishi is qualified to prosecute trademark applications, assist clients in copyright and licensing matters, and to represent clients in some court proceedings and custom seizure matters.

History

The benrishi profession was adopted from German patent law, which Japan duplicated during the Meiji era. The Benrishi Law (弁理士法 benrishi-hō) was passed in 1921 and remained almost unchanged through the end of the 20th century.

In 2001, after a decade of economic stagnation, the Benrishi Law was changed, and the role of the benrishi in the patent system was changed significantly. Benrishi were allowed to represent clients in adversarial proceedings before customs courts and in arbitration. The law was revised again in 2002 to allow benrishi to represent clients in courtroom litigation, either independently of or in cooperation with attorneys. Benrishi has been qualified to be a legal representative for appealing to the Intellectual Property High Court (the exclusive jurisdiction) representing the client against the adverse decision of Trial Board (consisting of three administrative trial judges) of Japan Patent Office, and even up to the Supreme Court (The Benrishi Law Article 6). Benrishi can also represent the infringement cases if it meets the criteria (The Benrishi Law Article 6bis).

See also 
 Bengoshi

References

External links
Review of Patent Attorney (Benrishi) Law, Japan Patent Office
History of the Japan Patent Attorneys Association, Japan Patent Attorneys Association

Japanese patent law
Region-specific legal occupations